Major-General Pierse Joseph Mackesy,  (5 April 1883 – 8 June 1956), born in Dublin, Ireland was a British Army officer who, early in the Second World War, led the attempt to recapture Narvik in April–May 1940 in the ill-fated Norwegian campaign.

Biography
Mackesy was the son of Lieutenant-General William Henry Mackesy, and was educated at St Paul's and RMA, Woolwich. He was commissioned into the Royal Engineers as a second lieutenant on 23 August 1902.

Mackesy became a survey specialist in the Gold Coast (Ghana) in 1911. The first eighteen months of his First World War service were in West Africa. Thereafter he served in France, where he was awarded the MC. As a captain he was Officer Commanding 518th (1/4th London) Field Company, Royal Engineers, from 1 June 1917 to 22 March 1918.

A staff officer with the North Russia Relief Force in 1919, he was appointed a Companion of the Distinguished Service Order before joining the Military Mission to South Russia in 1920. A student at the Staff College, Camberley between 1920 and 1921, he married in 1923 and, after a variety of postings at home and abroad, including service at the Staff College, Quetta as a General Staff Officer Grade 2 (GSO2), he was appointed to command 3rd Infantry Brigade at Borden in 1935. In Palestine between 1935 and 1938, he was promoted major-general in 1937 and, appointed a Companion of the Order of the Bath in 1938. He became GOC 49th (West Riding) Division in May 1938. He was also an adviser to the New Zealand government on defence. He returned to England at the start of the Second World War and re-assumed command of his division.

Destined to be sent to France to form part of Adam's III Corps of the BEF, 49th Division was instead held at home in readiness for operations in Scandinavia. As the Russo-Finish 'winter war' only interested the British government to the extent that it offered a pretext for interrupting the traffic of iron ore to Germany, 'Pat' Mackesy, with his experience of war in arctic conditions, was an obvious choice as commander of an expeditionary force. In the event British intervention in Scandinavia happened not, as was planned, to forestall German action but as a response to the German invasion of Norway. Mackesy, with one infantry brigade constituting 'Avonforce', was sent to invest the port of Narvik.

Enraging Churchill by refusing to commit his troops to 'the sheer bloody murder' of an 'arctic Gallipoli', Mackesy was recalled home and, amidst Churchillian mutterings about his 'feebleness and downright cowardice', was spared a court martial but never held command again.

Retired from the army in November 1940, Mackesy served for a while on various War Office committees and was an occasional contributor to the Daily Telegraph. Considered a drunkard and a security risk by Brooke, his mail was regularly intercepted. A Southwold borough councillor from 1946, he was subsequently mayor of the town on two separate occasions, as well as being a member of the East Suffolk County Council.

His son, Dr Piers Mackesy (1924–2014), was a noted military historian.

References

Bibliography
 T.K. Derry, History of the Second World War: The Campaign in Norway, London, HM Stationery Office, 1952.
 Alan H. Maude (ed.), The History of the 47th (London) Division 1914–1919, London: Amalgamated Press, 1922/Uckfield: Naval & Military Press, 2002, .

External links
British Army Officers 1939−1945
Generals of World War II

1883 births
1956 deaths
Academics of the Staff College, Quetta
British Army major generals
Royal Engineers officers
Graduates of the Royal Military Academy, Woolwich
British Army personnel of World War I
British Army generals of World War II
Recipients of the Military Cross
Companions of the Distinguished Service Order
Companions of the Order of the Bath
British Army personnel of the Russian Civil War
Graduates of the Staff College, Camberley
People educated at St Paul's School, London
Military personnel from Dublin (city)
British military personnel of the 1936–1939 Arab revolt in Palestine
Members of East Suffolk County Council